Nick Mangano is an American stage actor and director. He is the chair and artistic director of the Department of Theatre Arts at Stony Brook University.

Education
Mangano studied in New York, attending Hunter College, where he achieved a BA in history, and Columbia University School of the Arts, earning an MFA in directing. He studied the Chekhov acting technique with the international Michael Chekhov Association, earning a certification of completion.

Career
Mangano has worked in various aspects of theatre in the United States, including Broadway, and internationally. His direction has been favorably reviewed in The New York Times.

References

American male stage actors
Year of birth missing (living people)
Living people
Columbia University School of the Arts alumni
Hunter College alumni
Stony Brook University faculty